Platydictya is a genus of mosses belonging to the family Amblystegiaceae.

The species of this genus are found in Eurasia, Northern America, Antarctica.

Species:
 Platydictya acuminata (Lindb. & Arnell) Ignatov
 Platydictya baicalensis (Ignatov & Ochyra) Hedenäs & N.Pedersen

References

Amblystegiaceae
Moss genera